Nfinity is headquartered in Atlanta, Georgia, in the United States. Nfinity markets cheerleading, basketball, and volleyball shoes and apparel particularly for female athletes. Nfinity designs shoes for a segment of female athletes, attempting to fit to the biochemical needs to enhance athletic performance and lower the risk of injury.

References
Notes

Companies based in Atlanta
Shoe companies of the United States
Cheerleading